Vansickle is a community in the city of St. Catharines, Ontario, Canada. The area has seen a significant increase in residential development and, more recently, the construction of a four-pad sportsplex nearby. Many residents know the area for Club Roma, a banquet centre and soccer club that has served the city for decades.

Neighbourhoods in St. Catharines